Battle of the Bloody Ridge may refer to:

Battle of Bloody Ridge, a battle that took place August 18 – September 5, 1951 during the Korean War
Battle of Edson's Ridge, a battle that took place September 12 – 14, 1942 during the Guadalcanal Campaign in the Pacific War of World War II

See also
 Bloody Ridge (disambiguation)